Tharrawaddy may refer to:

 Tharrawaddy Min (1787–1846), 8th king of the Konbaung Dynasty of Burma, 1837–1846
 Tharrawaddy District, a district of Bago Division, Myanmar
 Tharrawaddy Township
 Tharrawaddy, Myanmar, the capital city